James Thompson (born 13 July 1999 in New Zealand) is a New Zealand rugby union player who plays for the  in Super Rugby. His playing position is flanker. He has signed for the Chiefs wider training squad in 2020.

Reference list

External links
itsrugby.co.uk profile

1999 births
New Zealand rugby union players
Living people
Rugby union flankers
Rugby union locks
Waikato rugby union players
Chiefs (rugby union) players
Rugby union players from Whakatāne